Philip Arnold Foy (16 October 1891 – 12 February 1957) was an Argentine first-class cricketer who played with his national side and Somerset. His best season for Somerset came in 1920 when he took 31 wickets at 22.48 and made 352 runs. In England when not playing with Somerset he represented Bedfordshire in 1909.

External links
Cricket Archive

1891 births
1957 deaths
Argentine cricketers
Somerset cricketers
Bedfordshire cricketers
English cricketers
British emigrants to Argentina
People from Axbridge